Quarryville was an unincorporated community in New Castle County, Delaware, United States. Quarryville is located along U.S. Route 13 Business between Bellefonte and Claymont. Quarryville is near Bellevue Lake, which was the site of the Bellevue Quarry. It was a small cluster of homes.

References 

Unincorporated communities in New Castle County, Delaware
Unincorporated communities in Delaware